The 2009–10 season was FK Partizan's 4th season in Serbian SuperLiga. This article shows player statistics and all matches (official and friendly) that the club played during the 2009–10 season.

Tournaments

Players

Squad information

Top scorers
Includes all competitive matches. The list is sorted by shirt number when total goals are equal.

Squad statistics

Competitions

Overview

Serbian SuperLiga

League table

Matches

Serbian Cup

UEFA Champions League

Qualifying phase

UEFA Europa League

Play-off round

Group stage

Friendlies

Transfers

In

Out

Sponsors

See also
List of unbeaten football club seasons

External links
 Official website
 Partizanopedia 2009-2010  (in Serbian)

FK Partizan seasons
Partizan
Serbian football championship-winning seasons